Hibbertia ciliolata is a species of flowering plant in the family Dilleniaceae and is endemic to the northern part of the Northern Territory. It is a shrub with a single stem, hairy foliage, linear to elliptic leaves, and yellow flowers arranged in leaf axils, mostly with eighteen to twenty-six stamens arranged in groups around the two carpels.

Description
There are eighteen to twenty-six stamens arranged in groups around the two carpels, each carpel with two ovules. Flowering occurs from November to June.

Taxonomy
Hibbertia ciliolata was first formally described in 2010 by Hellmut R. Toelken in the Journal of the Adelaide Botanic Gardens from specimens collected by Lyndley Craven and Clyde Robert Dunlop near Woolaning High School in 1981. The specific epithet (ciliolata) refers to the usually short hairs on the scales on the undersurface of the leaves.

Distribution and habitat
This hibbertia usually grows on sandstone or quartzite outcrops at the base of the Arnhem Land escarpment, but also as far west as Jasper Gorge in the Northern Territory.

Conservation status
Goodenia ciliolata is classified as of "least concern" under the Northern Territory Government Territory Parks and Wildlife Conservation Act 1976.

See also
List of Hibbertia species

References

ciliolata
Flora of the Northern Territory
Plants described in 2010
Taxa named by Hellmut R. Toelken